A by-election was held for the South Australian House of Assembly seat of Elizabeth on 1 December 1984. This was triggered by the resignation of former state Labor MHA Peter Duncan, who moved to the federal seat of Makin. The seat had been retained by Labor since it was created and first contested at the 1970 state election.

Results
Independent Labor candidate Martyn Evans won the seat from Labor.

See also
List of South Australian state by-elections

References

South Australian state by-elections
1984 elections in Australia
1980s in South Australia